Lundgren Guitar Pickups is a Swedish manufacturer of guitar and bass guitar pickups formed in 1990 by Johan Lundgren and situated in Jönköping. The company provides pickups for companies and luthiers such as the Ibanez's Custom Shop, Schecter Guitar Research, Halkan Guitars, Conklin Guitars, Nevborn Guitars, Crimson Guitars as well as private customers. They've also designed pickups for brands like Hagström Guitars. Along with their lineup of production pickups the company also custom makes, rewinds and repair older pickups. Pickups are available as single coils, humbuckers and P-90s wound with either formvar wire, plain enamel wire or polysol wires. Lundgrens PAF-style humbuckers are built after analyzing the originals from 1957 and 1958 and built with a vintage 1957 winding machine.

Notable users 
 Fredrik Thordendal - Meshuggah
 Mårten Hagström - Meshuggah 
 Tobias Forge - Ghost
 The Nameless Ghouls - Ghost
 Scott Gorham - Thin Lizzy 
 Tterrab Dys - Letters From The Colony
 Johan Jönsegård - Letters From The Colony
 Dregen - Backyard Babies 
 Charlie Sexton - Bob Dylan
 Chrissie Hynde - The Pretenders
 Sami Sirviö - Kent
 Anders Wendin - Moneybrother
 Pugh Rogefeldt
 Tosin Abasi - Animals As Leaders
 Tim Lim 
 Steven Henry - ex-Neuraxis, Urban Aliens, Idiotpathetics, Empathy Denied

External links 
 Official Website
 Official MySpace

Distributors
 Conklin Guitars - Distributor USA
 BRL Guitarworks - Distributor CANADA
 European Distribution handled directly by Lundgren Pickups.

References 

Guitar pickup manufacturers